Gershkovich is a surname. Notable people with the surname include:

 Philip Gershkovich
 Mikhail Gershkovich, Soviet footballer and coach

See also
 Hershkovich (Herskowitz)

Russian-language surnames
Jewish surnames
Yiddish-language surnames